Didiba may refer to:
 Didiba, Democratic Republic of the Congo

People with the surname 
 Joss Didiba, Cameroonian professional footballer